Gordonton is a village and rural community in Waikato District and Waikato region of New Zealand's North Island. It is located southeast of Taupiri on State Highway 1B.

The area was initially called Hukanui, which means "heavy frost" in the Māori language. It was renamed to Gordonton after John Gordon, who was a manager for the New Zealand Land Association in the Waikato from 1886.

The local Hukanui Marae is a meeting place of the local Waikato Tainui hapū of Ngāti Makirangi and Ngāti Wairere. It includes Te Tuturu-a-Papa Kamutu meeting house.

Demographics

Kainui-Gordonton had a population of 1,734 at the 2018 New Zealand census, an increase of 105 people (6.4%) since the 2013 census, and an increase of 237 people (15.8%) since the 2006 census. There were 549 households, comprising 873 males and 861 females, giving a sex ratio of 1.01 males per female. The median age was 35.8 years (compared with 37.4 years nationally), with 435 people (25.1%) aged under 15 years, 306 (17.6%) aged 15 to 29, 813 (46.9%) aged 30 to 64, and 177 (10.2%) aged 65 or older.

Ethnicities were 82.2% European/Pākehā, 14.4% Māori, 3.1% Pacific peoples, 8.7% Asian, and 1.7% other ethnicities. People may identify with more than one ethnicity.

The percentage of people born overseas was 17.3, compared with 27.1% nationally.

Although some people chose not to answer the census's question about religious affiliation, 45.0% had no religion, 44.8% were Christian, 0.5% had Māori religious beliefs, 0.2% were Hindu, 1.6% were Buddhist and 2.2% had other religions.

Of those at least 15 years old, 312 (24.0%) people had a bachelor's or higher degree, and 183 (14.1%) people had no formal qualifications. The median income was $40,100, compared with $31,800 nationally. 285 people (21.9%) earned over $70,000 compared to 17.2% nationally. The employment status of those at least 15 was that 714 (55.0%) people were employed full-time, 225 (17.3%) were part-time, and 39 (3.0%) were unemployed.

Education 

Eastwest College of Intercultural Studies is a Category 1 Private Training Establishment established on the western side of Gordonton in 1996 by WEC Aotearoa New Zealand. It is a Christian tertiary institute that offers both NZQA Level 5 and Level 6 diplomas in intercultural studies. WEC Aotearoa New Zealand headquarters is located next door.

Woodlands Estate 
Woodlands is a homestead and Garden of National Significance, established in the 1870s. The gardens occupy eight hectares and are open to the public.

References 

Waikato District
Populated places in Waikato